Edgar Henry Harris was an Australian politician. He was a member of the Western Australian Legislative Council representing the North-East Province from his election on 22 May 1920 until his retirement in 1934. Harris was a member of the Australian Labor Party until 1917, when he became a member of the National Party.

References 

Members of the Western Australian Legislative Council
20th-century Australian politicians